Dumas Oroño (30 October 1921 – 28 January 2005) was a Uruguayan artist, cultural manager, and teacher. His artistic work spanned several disciplines, including painting, engraving, ceramics, murals, and jewelry design.

Biography
Then he entered the Escuela del Sur, the workshop of Joaquín Torres-García, at the suggestion of Zoma Baitler.

In 1945 he moved to San José to teach drawing classes at the city's high school.

In San José he founded the Museum and Workshop of Plastic Arts and directed it from 1947 to 1953. He participated in the organization of the First Salon of Plastic Artists of the Interior in 1948. He also organized the Art Library and the Children's Drawing Workshop.

From 1948 to 1949 he worked in Cecilia Marcovich's studio in Buenos Aires. He participated in the fifth São Paulo Biennial in 1959 and the 1982 Venice Biennale.

In 1959 he invited other artists from the Torres-García Workshop to create a mural gallery in the  building in Las Piedras, a work that remained there until 1964.

He founded the support commission for the Juan Manuel Blanes Museum and helped plan a project to restore and expand the museum and its park and surroundings. A room of the museum bears his name.

He helped to organize the AEBU Show for Liberties in 1984. In 1984 he also contributed to "La peña de los viernes" at the Casa del Autor Nacional, days in which several Uruguayan authors participated.

Oroño won the Figari Award in 2004. He also received the President of the Republic Award for the oil painting Carro de verdulero (1948), the Salon of the Interior Portrait Award (1951), the Salon of the Interior first prize for the oil Tatiana (1952), the Salon of the Interior Acquisition Award for the oil Paisaje de Montmartre, and the Uruguayan Tourist Souvenir Salon Grand Prize (1969). He created a technique of engraving fire and color on calabazas, with which he won the Grand Prize of the Ministry of Tourism and Culture (1969).

He ventured into various disciplines such as drawing, painting, sculpture, murals, engraving, xylography, glazed ceramics, jewelry design, decorated calabazas, stained glass, terracotta, mosaics, acrylic paint, wood, and cement. In Montevideo he painted a score of murals by himself. Other murals of his are found in Punta del Este, Las Piedras, and Asunción, Paraguay.

He was the author of didactic texts such as La expresión plástica infantil (Imprenta López, Buenos Aires, 1951) and El dibujo en el liceo (Imprenta AS, Montevideo, 1961, reissued by EEPAL, Montevideo, 1989). His Cinco cuadernos pedagógicos remains unpublished.

References

Further reading
 

1921 births
2005 deaths
20th-century ceramists
20th-century Uruguayan educators
20th-century engravers
20th-century Uruguayan painters
20th-century Uruguayan sculptors
20th-century male artists
21st-century ceramists
21st-century Uruguayan educators
21st-century engravers
21st-century painters
21st-century sculptors
People from Tacuarembó
Uruguayan educators
Uruguayan muralists
Uruguayan potters